Macrochenus tigrinus is a species of beetle in the family Cerambycidae. It was described by Olivier in 1792, originally under the genus Cerambyx. It is known from Sri Lanka, India and Myanmar. It contains the varietas Macrochenus tigrinus var. tesselatus.

References

Lamiini
Beetles described in 1792